Pipobroman (trade names Vercite, Vercyte) is an anti-cancer drug that probably acts as an alkylating agent. It is marketed in France and Italy.

References 

Alkylating antineoplastic agents
Organobromides
Carboxamides
Piperazines